Joseph Logsdon (March 12, 1938 – June 2, 1999) was an American historian. He was a professor at University of New Orleans. Logsdon is known for his collaboration with Sue Eakin on a 1968 scholarly edition of Twelve Years a Slave.

A Chicago native, Logsdon got his bachelor's and master's degrees from the University of Chicago and a doctorate from the University of Wisconsin–Madison in the 1960s.

Logsdon died on June 2, 1999, at Ochsner Medical Center in Jefferson, Louisiana.

References 

1938 births
1999 deaths
University of Chicago alumni
University of Wisconsin–Madison alumni
University of New Orleans faculty
20th-century American historians
American male non-fiction writers
20th-century American male writers